Celya AB (born 1995) is a UK-based writer and comedian from Paris. She won the Best Newcomer Chortle award in 2022. She has been based in Birmingham and London.

Life 
Celya AB was born in 1995 and brought up in Paris. Her family lived in the suburb of Seine-Saint-Denis . She moved to Birmingham in 2014. She is of mixed French and Algerian heritage.

She discovered stand-up on a trip back to Paris and did her first gig in Birmingham. Celya made her stand-up debut at Sutton Coldfield’s The Comedy Junction in early 2017, encouraged by local comedian Karen Bayley.

In 2019 she won the Birmingham Comedy Festival Breaking Talent Award, and was also a finalist in the Funny Women awards.

In 2022 she won the "Best Newcomer award" from Chortle. She has appeared on BBC1 as a finalist in the BBC's New Comedy Award 2021, which was won by Welsh comedian Anna Thomas. Due to the COVID-19 pandemic in Scotland she, like other comedians including Thanyia Moore, did not make her debut at the Edinburgh Fringe until August 2022.

Comedy Style 
Celya has cited Dylan Moran and American comedian/ actress Maria Bamford, as well as French trio Les Inconnus and the late humourist Pierre Desproges, as formative influences.

References 

Living people
French expatriates in England
French people of Algerian descent
French stand-up comedians
French women comedians
People from Seine-Saint-Denis
1995 births